Martin Kellogg (March 15, 1828 – August 26, 1903) was born in Vernon, Connecticut, to Allyn Kellogg and Eliza Kellogg née White. He graduated from Yale as valedictorian of the Class of 1850. He was ordained as a missionary in the Congregational Church and served as a pastor in Shasta, California, in 1855, then in Grass Valley, California, from 1857 to 1860, and then in Oakland, California, starting in 1861.

Kellogg became the first member of the Academic Senate of the University of California on September 1, 1868. He served as acting president from 1890 to 1893, and was named the Seventh President of the University of California in 1893.

He served on the Board of Education in Berkeley and twice as Moderator of the General Association of California.

He served as a trustee of the First Congregational Church of Berkeley.

He died on August 26, 1903. He was preceded in death by his adopted daughter, Annie Day Kellogg, who committed suicide earlier that year on April 25, 1903.

References
 Inaugural Address--Our University a Public Trust, by Martin Kellogg
 University of California History--Digital Archives
 University Chronicle--University of California, Berkeley, Vol. 6
 Lives of the Dead: Mountain View Cemetery in Oakland
 The Year Book of the Congregational Christian Churches of the United States
 California Digital Newspaper Collection
 Martin Kellogg Fellowships

External links
 
 Portrait of Martin Kellogg from the Lick Observatory Records Digital Archive, UC Santa Cruz Library's Digital Collections

People from Berkeley, California
Leaders of the University of California, Berkeley
1828 births
1903 deaths
People from Vernon, Connecticut
Yale University alumni